Cesare Laurenti (Terracina, 1865 – Rome, 1921) was an Italian naval engineer.

Biography 
Laurenti was a naval engineering officer who designed submarines and founded a company to build them. He devoted himself to all branches of study in underwater navigation. In 1892 he became the director of technical experiments for the first Italian submarine, which was driven by a battery-powered electric motor and designed by Giacinto Pullino. Laurenti transformed it by adding a gasoline engine, thus allowing a large surfaced cruising range while recharging the batteries underway. In 1909-10 he designed  for the US Navy.

Laurenti is also credited with designing or assisting with the Provana class, 1905 Glauco class, Medusa class, Argonauta, F class, and the 1914 British S class (later Italian).

References

Laurenti, Cesare  (in Italian)
 Gardiner, Robert, Conway's All the World's Fighting Ships 1906–1921 Conway Maritime Press, 1985. .

Italian engineers
1865 births
1921 deaths